Masaki (written: , ,  or ) is a Japanese surname. Notable people with the surname include:

, Japanese science fiction writer
, Japanese general
, Japanese motorcycle racer
, Japanese Paralympic judoka
, Japanese manga artist, screenwriter and anime director
, Japanese AV idol, actress and gravure model
, Japanese samurai and potter
, Japanese judoka
, Japanese singer

Japanese-language surnames